Alex Wyse is an American stage and screen actor, writer, director, and producer. He is best known for playing Kyle in Marvel's Iron Fist, Saul Feinberg in The Bold and the Beautiful, Georg Zirschnitz in the 2015 Deaf West Broadway revival of Spring Awakening, and co-creating the digital series Indoor Boys.

Early life
Wyse grew up in Cleveland, Ohio where he graduated from Beachwood High School, and later graduated from Boston University with a degree in theatre.

Career
On television, Wyse has appeared in multiple roles since 2010 including Bored to Death, Switched at Birth, The Bold and the Beautiful, Marvel's Iron Fist, NCIS: Los Angeles, and Masters of Sex On film, he appeared opposite America Ferrera in X/Y.

With Wesley Taylor, he co-wrote and co-directed his debut feature film Summoning Sylvia set for release in 2022, and he co-created, wrote, directed, edited, and starred in the digital series Indoor Boys, which was nominated for a Daytime Emmy Award and thirty-three Indie Series Awards, winning twelve, including Best Comedy, Comedy Writing, Comedy Directing, and Best Lead Actor for Wyse, before being acquired by Here TV.

On Broadway, he made his debut in Lysistrata Jones, which ran at the Walter Kerr Theatre from 2011 to 2012. He then played schoolboy Georg Zirschnitz in the Deaf West Theatre's production of Spring Awakening, and in 2018, he joined the musical Waitress, as Ogie.

Off-Broadway, he has been seen in Lysistrata Jones, Triassic Parq, Bare, and Ride the Cyclone. In 2013–2014, he toured with the national company of Wicked, playing the role of Boq. In 2015, he appeared opposite Evan Rachel Wood and Rumer Willis in For the Record in Los Angeles.

He also co-produced the Broadway transfer of Heidi Schreck's play What the Constitution Means to Me, which opened at the Helen Hayes Theater on March 31, 2019.  He received nominations for a Tony, Drama Desk, and Outer Critics Circle Award for acting as part of the producing team.

With Ben Fankhauser, he co-wrote the book, lyrics, and music for A Commercial Jingle For Regina Comet, which played off-Broadway at the Daryl Roth Theater in 2021.

In April 2023, Wyse will play Max Weinbaum in the Broadway production of Doug Wright's Good Night, Oscar at the Belasco Theatre.

Theatre credits

Filmography

References 

Living people
Year of birth missing (living people)
21st-century American male actors
21st-century American LGBT people
American gay actors
American male soap opera actors
American male stage actors
American male television actors
Boston University College of Fine Arts alumni
People from Beachwood, Ohio